Walter "Sam" Williams (June 29, 1924 – October 15, 2012) was an American college basketball coach. He is considered an early pioneer of racial integration in the college game and is the University of Texas–Pan American's all-time leader in wins (244), including its only men's basketball national championship in 1962–63. Williams is referred to as the "Father of Broncs Basketball" at Texas Pan–American. He oversaw the school's transition from a National Association of Intercollegiate Athletics (NAIA) program into an NCAA Division I program. During his 15 year tenure, he had 11 winning seasons, 4 20-win seasons, and 244 total victories. He also coached the baseball team for one season.

The UTPA Fieldhouse, where the team plays their home games, had its center court rededicated to Williams on November 20, 2010. He was also named head coach emeritus, becoming just the second former coach at Texas Pan–American to earn that honor (baseball coach Al Ogletree was the first).

Williams died on October 15, 2012, from natural causes.

Head coaching record

Basketball

Baseball

References

1924 births
2012 deaths
Basketball coaches from Texas
High school basketball coaches in the United States
People from Daingerfield, Texas
People from McAllen, Texas
UT Rio Grande Valley Vaqueros baseball coaches
UT Rio Grande Valley Vaqueros men's basketball coaches